FlyerTalk is an Internet forum for discussion of airline frequent-flyer programs, hotel loyalty programs and other issues related to travel. The site was founded in 1998 by Randy Petersen and was acquired by Internet Brands in 2007.

History
According to Petersen, as editor of InsideFlyer, he saw FlyerTalk as a way to allow readers to combine their knowledge into a knowledge base. Since then, the site has grown to more than 200 forums, 750,000 members and over 30,000,000 posts. The site has approximately 20 million page views per month and 27,000 – 52,000 daily unique visitors. 

On 16 November 2010,  Petersen stated that he would leave FlyerTalk at the end of the year; then in March 2011, he launched MilePoint. MilePoint's brand was changed to InsideFlyer as Petersen started to build a  global footprint with local languages in various countries around the world.

Industry Use
Some of the hotel and airline forum participants include official presences who use the site to learn about issues important to their customer base. One example of the site's influence was a wager between the Continental Airlines CEO Larry Kellner and a site member as to whether 60 or more community members would voluntarily fly (using their own miles and incurring their own out-of-pocket expenses) to a feedback meeting in Houston for the airline; 274 did.
the forum has been cited as a powerful voice in shaping airlines' reward programs  and as a source for novel ways to use frequent flier miles.

See also 
 List of Internet forums

References

External links 
 FlyerTalk

Aviation Internet forums
American travel websites
Internet properties established in 1998
2007 mergers and acquisitions